Members of the New South Wales Legislative Assembly  who served in the 26th parliament of New South Wales held heir seats from 1922 to 1925. They were elected at the 1922 state election on 25 March 1922. The Speaker was Daniel Levy.

Under the provisions of the Parliamentary Elections (Casual Vacancies) Act, casual vacancies were filled by the next unsuccessful candidate on the departing member's party list. If an Independent member retired, the Clerk of the Assembly determined who would fill the vacancy based on the departing members voting record in questions of confidence.

See also
Second Fuller ministry
Results of the 1922 New South Wales state election
Candidates of the 1922 New South Wales state election

References

Members of New South Wales parliaments by term
20th-century Australian politicians